Heidal is a former municipality in the old Oppland county, Norway. The  municipality existed from 1908 until its dissolution in 1965. The former municipality is now part of the present-day Sel Municipality in Innlandet county. The administrative centre of the old municipality was the village of Bjølstad where the Heidal Church is located. The municipality encompassed the whole Heidal valley area.

History
The municipality of Heidal (originally spelled Hedalen) was established on 1 January 1908. On that date, the large Vågå Municipality was divided into three parts: the northeast part became Sel Municipality (population: 2,287), the southeast part became Heidal Municipality (population: 1,241), and the western part remained as Vågå Municipality (population: 2,953). During the 1960s, there were many municipal mergers across Norway due to the work of the Schei Committee. On 1 January 1965, the municipality of Heidal (population: 1,731) was dissolved and it was merged with the municipality of Sel (population: 3,687) plus the Tolstadåsen area of Vågå (population: 35) and the Sjoa area of Nord-Fron (population: 413) to form a new, larger Sel Municipality.

Government
All municipalities in Norway, including Heidal, are responsible for primary education (through 10th grade), outpatient health services, senior citizen services, unemployment and other social services, zoning, economic development, and municipal roads. The municipality was governed by a municipal council of elected representatives, which in turn elected a mayor.

Municipal council
The municipal council  of Heidal was made up of 13 representatives that were elected to four year terms. The party breakdown of the final municipal council was as follows:

See also
List of former municipalities of Norway

References

Sel
Former municipalities of Norway
1908 establishments in Norway
1964 disestablishments in Norway